Garko is a Local Government Area in Kano State, Nigeria. Its headquarters are in the town of Garko on the A237 highway.

It has an area of 450 km and a population of 162,500 at the 2006 census.

The postal code of the area is 712.

References

Local Government Areas in Kano State